Hoseynabad-e Dehdar (also Romanized as Ḩoseynābād-e Dehdār) is a village in Hoseynabad Rural District, Esmaili District, Anbarabad County, Kerman Province, Iran. At the 2006 census, its population was 2,235, in 474 families.

References 

Populated places in Anbarabad County